Breakdance is an amusement ride designed by Huss Maschinenfabrik GmbH & Co. KG in 1985.

Upon release, the ride design proved to be an instant hit, with HUSS now producing four varying designs, all of which can be acquired in transportable, semi-permanent, or permanent forms.

Design and operation
Breakdance consists of a dodecagonal platform with a diameter of 20 meters, upon which are mounted four hubs, each bearing four two-person cars. The entire ride is on an incline of 7.5°. When the ride is activated, the platform rotates, the hubs rotate in the opposite direction to the platform. The combination of the platform slope, hub movement, and weight displacement within the cars cause them to rock back and forth, the oblique join mount and the motion of the ride allowing the cars to rotate through 360°.

Breakdances incorporate backdrops, and the provision for sound systems, elaborate light displays, and special effects equipment is made. Controls for these additional systems can easily be routed through the operator's console.

Traveling versions of this ride can be disassembled and stowed on two  trailers, one for the ride itself, the other carrying the platforms, backdrop, special effects equipment and ticketbox.

Variants
The success of the design has prompted HUSS to manufacture three additional variants to the Breakdance design. These are:
 Breakdance 2 - Six four-car hubs are installed on the  Octadecagon platform.
No backdrop is sold with this ride, which in combination with the size and slope reductions, significantly reduces the overall weight of the ride. The 8 ton difference makes this variant popular for transportable operations.
 Breakdance 4 - Also known as a Rodeo, this variant removes the platform entirely. Instead, three four-members of a "crew" are connected to the central dance by extended arms. There is no slope to the dance. It is much better suited for families than the other variants.

Although officially a different ride and not a variant of Breakdance, after the success of Breakdance HUSS developed the Booster ride, which takes the idea a step further. It did not, however, gain the kind of success that Breakdance did.

Similar rides
Rides almost identical to the Breakdance have been produced by other companies.
Below are listed the companies, with the ride name in brackets.
 Safeco (Blade Runner)
 Sobema (Break Dance)
 Fabbri Group (Crazy Dance)
 Top Fun (Magic Dance)
 Nauta Bussink (Star Dancer)
 Parkash (Break Dance)

Appearances
Over 110 Breakdance rides have been manufactured by HUSS, the vast majority of which are still in operation.

Transportable

Theme parks

External links

 Technical specifications available at HUSS Park Attractions's website
 Amusement Ride Extravaganza - Breakdance
 a video of a huss breakdance onride

References

Amusement rides
Amusement rides introduced in 1985